The filmography on immigration in Italy is a phenomenon started with the arrival of the first migratory flows in Italy, since the 1990s.

Italian films

1988 - 1999
 Emir Kusturica, Time of the Gypsies (United Kingdom/Italy/Yugoslavia, 1988) 
 Michele Placido, Pummarò (Italy, 1990)
 Marcello Bivona, Clandestini nella città (Italy/Tunisia, 1992)
 Claudio Fragasso, Teste rasate (Italy, 1993)
 Gianni Amelio, Lamerica (Italy/France/Switzerland, 1994)
 Maurizio Zaccaro, Article 2 – L’Articolo 2 - (Italy, 1994)
 Renzo Martinelli, The Waterbaby - Sarahsarà (Italy, 1994)
 Various directors, Intolerance (Italy, 1996)
 Carlo Mazzacurati, Vesna va veloce (Italy/France, 1996)
 Matteo Garrone, Terra di mezzo (Italy, 1996)
 Massimo Martelli, Pole pole (Italy, 1996)
 Rachid Benhadj, Another Country in My Eyes : The Tree of Hanging Destinies - L’albero dei destini sospesi (Italy, 1997)  
 Bernardo Bertolucci, Besieged (Italy/United Kingdom, 1998)
 Mohammed Hammoussi, Permesso di soggiorno (Italy, 1998)
 Luigi Faccini, Giamaica (Italy, 1998)
 Matteo Garrone, Guests - Ospiti  (Italy, 1998)

2000 - 2009
 Corso Salani, West - Occidente (Italy, 2000)
 Marco Manetti and Antonio Manetti, Zora the Vampire (Italy, 2000)
 Vincenzo Marra, Sailing Home - Tornando a casa (Italy, 2001)
 Gianluca Greco, Nemmeno in un sogno (Italy, 2001)
 Ennio De Dominicis, L’italiano (Italy, 2001)
 Edmund Budina, Letters in the Wind (Italy, 2002)
 Enrica Colosso, Chi non rischia non beve champagne (Italy, 2002)
 Alessandro Benvenuti, Ti spiace se bacio mamma? (Italy, 2003)
 Francesco Munzi, Saimir (Italy, 2004)
 Enrico Verra, Sotto il sole nero (Italy, 2004)
 Vittorio De Seta, Letters from the Sahara - Lettere dal Sahara (Italy, 2005)
 Marco Tullio Giordana, Once You're Born You Can No Longer Hide (Italy, 2005)
 Giorgio Diritti, Il vento fa il suo giro (Italy, 2005)
 Daniele Vicari, L'orizzonte degli eventi (Italy, 2005)
 Carmine Amoroso, Cover Boy (Italy, 2006) 
 Vittorio Moroni, Le ferie di Licu (Italy, 2006)
 Costanza Quatriglio, Il mondo addosso (Italy, 2006)
 Carlo Mazzacurati, La giusta distanza (Italy, 2007)
 Mohsen Melliti, I, the Other (Italy, 2007)
 Marco Simon Puccioni, Shelter Me (aka Riparo) (Italy, 2007) 
 Claudio Cupellini, Lezioni di cioccolato (Italy, 2007)
 Laura Muscardin, Billo - Il grand Dakhaar (Italy/Senegal, 2007)
 Paolo Genovese and Luca Miniero, This Night Is Still Ours (Italy, 2008)
 Cristina Comencini, Bianco e nero (Italy, 2008)
 Federico Bondi, Black Sea (Italy/France/Romania, 2008) 
 Nello La Marca, La Terramadre (Italy, 2008)
 Enrico Pitzianti, Tutto torna (Italy, 2008)
 Francesco Munzi, The Rest of the Night - Il resto della notte (Italy, 2008)
 Mohamed Zineddaine, Tu te souviens d'Adil? - Ti ricordi di Adil? (Morocco/Italia, 2008)
 Marco Campogiani, The Right Thing - La cosa giusta (Italy, 2009)
 Razi Mohebi, Reame del Nulla (Italy, 2009)
 Claudio Noce, Good morning Aman (Italy, 2009)

2010 - 2019
 Isotta Toso, Scontro di civiltà per un ascensore in Piazza Vittorio (Italy, 2010)
 Paola Randi, Into Paradiso (Italy, 2010)
 Andrea Segre, Il Sangue verde (Italy, 2010)
 Pino Esposito, Il nuovo sud dell'Italia  (Italy/Switzerland, 2010)
 Razi Mohebi, Gridami (Italy, 2010)
 Peter Del Monte, The Ballad of the Windshield Washers (Italy, 2010)
 Marco Turco, La straniera (Italy, 2010)
 Ricky Tognazzi, The Father and the Foreigner (Italy, 2010)
 Massimo Coppola, Afraid of the Dark (Bruises) - Hai paura del buio (Italy, 2010) – TV Movie
 Stefano Incerti, Gorbaciof (Italy, 2010)
 Alessio Maria Federici, Lezioni di cioccolato 2 (Italy, 2011)
 Claudia Palazzi and Clio Sozzani, Jeans and Martò (Italy, 2011)
 Francesco Patierno, Things from Another World (Italy, 2011)
 Andrea Segre, Shun Li and the Poet (Italy/France, 2011)
 Emanuele Crialese, Terraferma (Italy/France, 2011)
 Anis Gharbi, To Paradise (Italy, 2011)
 Ermanno Olmi, The Cardboard Village (Italy, 2011)
 Martina Parenti and Massimo D’Anolfi, Il castello (Italy, 2011)
 Guido Lombardi, Là-bas: A Criminal Education (Italy, 2011)
 Lorenzo Ceva Valla Mario Garofalo, Ainom (Italy, 2011)
 Gianluca De Serio, Massimiliano De Serio, Sette opere di misericordia (Italy/Romania, 2011) 
 Mary Griggion, Sotto lo stesso Cielo (Italy, 2012)
 Peter Marcias, Dimmi che destino avrò (Italy, 2012)
 Paolo Bianchini, Il sole dentro (Italy, 2012)  
 Filippo Grilli, La sabbia nelle tasche (Italy, 2012)  
 Francesco Castellani, Black star. Nati sotto una stella nera (Italy, 2012) 
 Claudio Giovannesi, Alì Blue Eyes (Italy, 2012)
 Antonio Bellia, Il santo nero (Italy, 2013)  
 Andrea Segre, First Snowfall (Italy, 2013)
 Daniele Gaglianone, My Class (Italy, 2013)
 Alessandro Gassman, Razzabastarda (Italy, 2013)
 Haider Rashid, Sta per piovere (Italy/Iraq, 2013)
 Laura Halilovic, Io Rom romantica (Italy, 2014)
 Antonio Augugliaro, Gabriele Del Grande and Khaled Soliman Al Nassiry, On the Bride's Side (Italy, 2014)
 Pupi Avati, Con il sole negli occhi (Italy, 2015) – TV Movie
 Laura Bispuri, Sworn Virgin (Italy/Switzerland/France/Germany/Albania/Kosovo, 2015)
Gianfranco Rosi, Fire at Sea (Italy, 2016)
Suranga Deshapriya Katugampala, Per un figlio (Italy/Sri Lanka, 2016)
Phaim Bhuiyan, Bangla (Italy, 2019)
Roberto San Pietro, The Vegetarian  - Il vegetariano (Italy, 2019)
Giulio Base, Bar Jospeph - Bar Giuseppe (Italy, 2019)

2020 - 
Marco Pontecorvo and Claudio Amendola, Carlo & Malik - Nero a metà -  television series  (2018-2022)
Luciano Manuzzi, Mom to Hundreds - Tutto il giorno davanti (2020)
Maurizio Zaccaro, Nour, (2020) 
Hleb Papou, The Legionnaire – Il legionario  (2021) 
Claudio Rossi Massimi, The Right to Happiness - Il diritto alla felicità (2021) 
Mario Vitale, L'afide e la formica (2021)

Other films
 Olivia Lamasan, Milan (Philippines, 2004)
 Valeriu Jereghi, Arrivederci (Moldova, 2008)
 Thomas Ciulei, Il ponte di fiori (Podul de Flori) (Romania/Germany, 2008)
 Mark A. Reyes, I.T.A.L.Y. (I Trust and Love You) (Philippines, 2008)
 Bobby Paunescu, Francesca (Romania, 2009)
 Dyana Gaye, Under the Starry Sky - Des Étoiles (France, 2013) 
 Ben Sombogaart, Rafaël, (Netherlands/Belgium/Croatia, 2018)

Italian short films and documentaries

1992 - 1999
 Hatem Abed, Roma profuma di nuove spezie, 19’
 Arnaldo Catinari, Shish Mahal (Italy, 1992) 28’
 Mino Crocè, L’altro aspetto (Italy, 1992) 14’
 Monica Stambrini, Vorrei urlare (Italy, 1994) 13’
 Gianfranco Galiè, Tutti i colori del cielo (Italy, 1994) 60’
 Marcello Casarini, La ruota spezzata (Italy, 1995) 50’ 
 Stefano Monticelli, Su-nu-gal: la nostra piroga (Italy, 1996) 40’
 Quirino Di Paolo, Il tempo di ascoltare (Italy, 1996) 20’
 Maurizio Pasetti, Andrea Rossini, Cartoline dalla Jugoslavia - Rom Khorakhané a Brescia, 1991-1996 (Italy, 1997) 23’

2000 - 2009
 Alessandro Angelini, Ragazzi del Ghana (Italy, 2000) 43’
 Armando Ceste, Abdellah e i suoi fratelli (Italy, 2000) 56’
 Jacopo Quadri, Mario Martone, Un posto al mondo (Italy, 2000) 76’
 Vincenzo Mancuso, Tra Genova e Fez. Una famiglia in viaggio (Italy, 2002) 49’
 Michele Carrillo, Tra due terre (Italy, 2005) 70’
 Mario Garofalo, Jasmine (Italy, 2005) 14’
 Claudio Bozzatello, Foku - Fuoco Sporco (Italy, 2005) 18’40’’
 Christian Bonatesta, Approdo Italia (Italy, 2005)
 Armando Ceste, Love difference (Italy, 2006) 25’
 Massimiliano Pacifico and Diego Liguori, Cricket Cup (Italy, 2006) 49’
 Agostino Ferrente, L’orchestra di Piazza Vittorio (Italy, 2006) 93’
 Nene Griffagnini and Francesco Conversano, Partire, Ritornare. In viaggio con Tahar Ben Jelloun (Italy, 2007) 50’
 Claudio Giovannesi, Welcome Bucarest (Italy, 2007) 40'
 Andrea Deaglio, Nera. Non è la terra promessa (Italy, 2007) 22’
 Federico Ferrone, Michele Manzolini, Francesco Ragazzi, Merica! (Italy, 2007) 65’
  Dagmawi Yimer, Sintayehu Eshetu, Solomon Moges, Menghistu Andechal, Adam Awad, Il deserto e il mare (Italy, 2007)  60’
 Carlotta Ehremberg, Dietro la porta (Italy, 2007) 6’
 Laye Gaye, Life in the city (Italy, 2008) 30’
 Andrea Segre, Riccardo Biadene and Dagmawi Yimer, Come un uomo sulla terra (Italy, 2008) 60’
 Marco Segato, Via Anelli, la chiusura del ghetto (Italy, 2008) 68'
 Filippo Meneghetti, Maistrac - Lavorare in Cantiere (Italy, 2008) 55’
 Marco Simon Puccioni, Il colore delle parole (Italy, 2009), 70’
 Lemnaouer Ahmine, La trappola (Italy/Algeria, 2009), 54’
 Antonio Martino, Nìguri (Italy, 2009) 50’
 Simone Amendola, Alisya nel Paese delle Meraviglie (Italy, 2009), 38’
 Edoardo Winspeare, Sotto il Celio Azzurro (Italy, 2009) 80’
 Andrea Solieri and Cristiano Regina, Liberi altrove,  (Italy, 2009)  20’
 Andrea D'Ambrosio and Maurizio Cartolano, Campania burning (Italy, 2009)  60’
 Rossella Piccinno, Hanna e Violka (Italy/Polonia, 2009) 56’
 Riccardo Cremona, Vincenzo De Cecco, Miss little China (Italy, 2009)
 Enrico Montalbano, Angela Giardina, Ilaria Sposito, La Terra (e)strema (Italy, 2009) 55’

2010 -
 Dagmawi Yimer, C.A.R.A. Italia (Etiopia/Italia, 2010)
 Jacopo Tartarone, Hermanitos, fratelli d'Italia (Italy, 2010)
 Dagmawi Yimer, Fabrizio Barraco and Giulio Cederna, Soltanto il mare (Italy, 2010)  
 Dario Leone, Adina e Dumitra (Italy, 2010) 5’
 Gabriele Borghi, Lettera a Natasha (Italy, 2010) 8’20’’
 Anna Bernasconi and Giulia Ciniselli, Via Padova – Istruzioni per l’uso (Italy, 2010) 52’
 Bepi Vigna, Atteros: breve viaggio nel mondo dell’immigrazione (Italy, 2010) 49’30’’
 Luca Romano, Francesco Amodeo, Armando Andria, Mario Leonbruno, Non è un paese per neri (Italy, 2010) 52’
 Federico Greco, MEI [MEIG] Voci Migranti (Italy, 2010) 50’
 Gianfranco Marino, Life in Italy is Ok - Emergency Programma Italia (Italy, 2011), 38’
 Diego Garbini and Toni Garbini, Un luogo comune (Italy, 2011), 44’ 
 Ilyess Ben Chouikha and Giulia Bondi, Harraguantanamo (Italy, 2011) 5’
 Matteo Calore and Stefano Collizzolli, I nostri anni migliori (Italy, 2011) 46’
 Aluk Amiri, Hamed Dera, Hevi Dilara, Zakaria Mohamed Ali e Dagmawi Yimer, Benvenuti in Italia (Italy, 2011) 60’
 Mariangela Barbanente, Ferrhotel (Italy, 2011) 73’
 Imad Al Hunaiti, Eranga Hettiwatte, Nizar Jelassi, Anita Magno, Tomo Sulejmanovic, Patrizia Maiorana, Giuseppe Minolfi, Libera tutti (Italy, 2011) 109’
 Lemnaouer Ahmine and Francesco Cannito, La curt de l'America (Italy, 2011) 52’
 Alvaro Lanciai, Locked in Limbo (Italy, 2011), 61’ 
 Annamaria Gallone, Le due storie di Adamà (Italy, 2011), 50’  
 Juan Martin Baigorria and Lisa Tormena, Aicha è tornata (Italy, 2011), 33’  
 Fred Kudjo Kuwornu, 18 Ius soli (Italy, 2011) 50’
 Adil Tanani, Il debito del mare (Italy, 2011) 15’
 Harvinder Sing, Saverio Paoletta, Tan kosh (progetto I cinque favoriti) (2011) 52’
 Franco Basaglia, Le perle di ritorno (Italy, 2011) 62’ 
 Francesco Cannito, Luca Cusani, Lemnaouer Ahmine, Il rifugio (Italy, 2011) 65’ 
 Simone Brioni, Graziano Chiscuzzu, Ermanno Guida, La quarta via. Mogadiscio, Italia (Italy, 2012) 37'  
 Simone Brioni, Graziano Chiscuzzu, Ermanno Guida, Aulò. Roma Postcoloniale (Italy, 2012) 47'  
 Maura Delpero, Nadea e Sveta (Italy, 2012) 62’  
 Stefano Liberti and Andrea Segre, Mare chiuso (Italy, 2012)
 Daniele Vicari, La nave dolce (Italy, 2012)
 Simone Amendola, Padrone bravo (Italy, 2012), 48’
 Mattia Levratti and Alessandro Levratti, La prigione degli altri (2012) 21’
 Cristian Sabatelli, Pippo Cariglia, L’altra città (2012) 38’
  Martin Errichiello and Gabriele Sossella, Arcipelaghi (Italy, 2012) 18’
 Cinzia Castania, Mineo Housing (Italy, 2012), 59’
 Alessandro Grande, Margerita (Italy, 2013), 15’
 Dagmawi Yimer, Va’ Pensiero, storie ambulanti  (2013)
 Alessio Genovese and Raffaella Cosentino, EU 013, l'ultima frontiera (Italy, 2013) 62’
 Stefano Mencherini, Schiavi (Italy, 2013)
 Stefano Liberti, Enrico Parenti, Container 158 (Italy, 2013), 62’ 
 Morteza Kaleghi, La polvere di Kabul
 Giusy Buccheri and Michele Citoni, Il futuro è troppo grande,  (Italy, 2014) 75’ 
 Andrea Segre, Come il peso dell'acqua (Italy, 2014), 110'
 David Fedele, The Land Between (Italy, 2014) 78’
 Paolo Martino, Terra di transito (Italy, 2014), 54’
 Marcello Merletto, Wallah Je te jure (Niger, Senegal, Italy, 2016), 63' 
R. Benbrik, E. Colanero, R. Danise, A. Riccardi, S. Tali, T. Fischer, Fuori fuoco (Italy, 2018), 78'

See also

 Immigration to Italy

 Forced displacement in popular culture

References

Awards and Film Festivals
 Festival del cinema africano, d'Asia e America Latina, Milan
 Festival Cinéma et Migrations, Agadir
 Terra di tutti Film Festival, Bologna
 Lampedusa in Festival, Lampedusa
 Festival del Cinema dei Diritti Umani, Naples
 Festival di cinema africano Verona
 Premio Mutti – AMM, per il Cinema migrante
 RIACEinFESTIVAL - Festival delle Migrazioni e delle Culture locali, Riace
 Bando internazionale per cortometraggi sull'immigrazione
 Festival migrantskega filma - Festival of Migrant Film, Ljubljana
 Rassegna Crocevia di sguardi. Documentari e approfondimenti per capire le migrazioni, Turin

Bibliography

in English
 Russel King,The Troubled Passage: Migration and New Cultural Encounters in Southern Europe in The Mediterranean Passage: Migration and New Cultural Encounters in Southern Europe, ed. Russell King, 1-21, Liverpool: Liverpool University Press (2001)
 Nicola Mai,  Myths and moral panics: Italian identity and the media representation of Albanian immigration, in: Grillo, R. D and Pratt, Jeff. C, (eds.) The Politics of Recognising Difference: Multiculturalism Italian Style. Research in migration and ethnic relations series, Ashgate, Aldershot, pp. 77–94 (2002) 
 Michela Ardizzoni, Redrawing the Boundaries of Italianness: Televised Identities in the Age of Globalisation, “Social Identities”, 11.5: 509-29 (2005)
 Derek Duncan, The Sight and Sound of Albanian Migration in Contemporary Italian Cinema, New Readings 8:1-15 (2007)
 Derek Duncan, Italy’s Postcolonial Cinema and its Histories of Representation, “Italian Studies”, 63.2: 195-211 (2008)
 Áine O'Healy, Mediterranean Passages: Abjection and Belonging in Contemporary Italian Cinema, “California Italian Studies”, 1:1 (2010)
 Grace Russo Bullaro, From Terrone to Extracomunitario: New Manifestations of Racism in Contemporary Italian Cinema, Troubador Publishing, Leicester (2010) 
 Sabine Schrader/Daniel Winkler Ed., The Cinema of Italian Migration. European and Transatlantic Narratives, Cambridge Scholars Publishing, Newcastle-upon-Tyne, 2013 (con una filmografia tematica dal film muto ad oggi)
 Áine O'Healy, Postcolonial Theory and Italy’s ‘Multicultural’ Cinema, "The Italian Cinema Book", ed. Peter Bondanella, Basingstoke: Palgrave, (2014) 295-302.

in Italian
 Ada Lonni, Immigrati, Bruno Mondadori, Turin, 2003
 Luisa Cicognetti and Lorenza Servetti, Migranti in celluloide: storici, cinema ed emigrazione, Editoriale umbra, Foligno, 2003
 Sonia Cincinelli, I migranti nel cinema italiano, Kappa Edizioni, Rome, 2009
 Ernesto Calvanese, Media e immigrazione tra stereotipi e pregiudizi. La rappresentazione dello straniero nel racconto giornalistico, FrancoAngeli, Milan, 2011
 Sonia Cincinelli, Senza frontiere. L’immigrazione nel cinema italiano, Kappa edizioni, Rome, 2012
 Claudia Svampa, Cinquanta sfumature di mare (per gli immigrati al largo del cinema italiano),  “Liberta Civili”, May-June 2012, 29
 Enrico Cammarata, Cinema e diritti umani. Una breve storia, Ti Pubblica, 2013
 Andrea Corrado, Igor Mariottini, preface by Gianni Canova, Cinema e autori sulle tracce delle migrazioni, Ediesse, Rome, 2013 
 Vincenzo Valentino,  Racconti di immigrazione nel cinema del reale, on "Officina della Storia", June 10, 2014

in French
 Romain Blandeau, Un nouveau cinéma italien en prise avec l’immigration, www.lesinrocks.com, 30 settembre 2011

External links
  Gianluca Arnone, Immigrazione, il cinema non indifferente, www.cinematografo.it, July 8, 2013
  Simone Saibene, Gli immigrati nel cinema italiano, on Popoli, 2008
  Gli immigrati di seconda generazione nel cinema europeo contemporaneo, on www.minori.it, June 10, 2011
  Filmography on "Movies and Migrations" - Cestim on line
  List of films and documentaries - Archivio Memorie Migranti
  Documentaries on migrations to Italy, “Libero Bizzarri” Foundation